KWEI may refer to:

KKOO (AM), a radio station (1260 AM) licensed to Weiser, Idaho, United States, which held the call sign KWEI from 2014 to 2018
KTRP (AM), a radio station (1450 AM) licensed to Notus, Idaho, United States, known as KWEI from 2011 to 2014
KLXI, a radio station (99.5 FM) licensed to Fruitland, Idaho, United States, known as KWEI-FM from 1983 to 2011